Shrirampur  taluka, is a taluka in Shrirampur subdivision of Ahmednagar district in Maharashtra State of India.

Area
The table below shows area of the taluka by land type.

Villages
There are around 56 villages in Shrirampur taluka. For list of villages see Villages in Shrirampur taluka. Belapur is one of the important place and developed village in taluka.

Population
The table below shows population  of the taluka by sex. The data is as per 2001 census.

Rain Fall
The Table below details of rainfall from year 1981 to 2004.

Best places to visit in ukkalgaon==See also==
 Shrirampur
 Talukas in Ahmednagar district
 Villages in Shrirampur taluka

References

Talukas in Maharashtra
Cities and towns in Ahmednagar district
Talukas in Ahmednagar district
Shrirampur